Mxolisi Mgingqeni Majozi  (born May 19, 1976) also known as Zuluboy is a South African actor and musician from Ntuzuma, KwaZulu-Natal, South Africa. He has worked with legendary South African hip hop artists, most of whom he drew inspiration from such as PRO.

Career 
His breakthrough song was "Nomalanga" from the album Inqolobane, it was released in 2008. He went on to win the Best Rapper Award at the 2008 Metro FM awards.

At the 2009 MTV Africa Music Awards  he was nominated  for Best Hip Hop.

Acting and television career 
Mxolisi has had a successful career as an actor and television host. From 2012 to 2016 he hosted the SABC 1 variety show and Fan Base, across four seasons. Zuluboy appeared in the first season of the SABC 1 drama series InterSEXions. He played the role of Big Boy Gumede on etv's hit series Gold Diggers. He was seen on the South African show Uzalo from season  4-6 playing a role of Last number and is currently on Durban Gen as MacGyver.

Radio 
He also worked as a Dj on the largest radio station in Africa, Ukhozi FM. He was released from Ukhozi FM after having contractual disputes with the station.

Discography

Studio albums
Zivile (2008)
Inqolobane (2008)
Masihambisane  (2009)
Igoda (2009)
Crisis Management  (2012)
Sghubhu Sa Mampela (2012)
AM-PM Producers Edition (2014)

Filmography

References 

1976 births
Living people
Musicians from Durban
People from KwaZulu-Natal
South African rappers
South African record producers
Zulu people